The Adventurers may refer to:

Film
 The Adventurers (1926 film), a German silent film
 The Adventurers (1951 film), a British adventure film
 The Adventurers (1970 film), an American film based on the novel by Harold Robbins
 The Adventurers (1995 film), a Hong Kong film starring Andy Lau, Jacklyn Wu, and Rosamund Kwan
 The Adventurers (2014 film), a Russian adventure film
 The Adventurers (2017 film), a Hong Kong film starring Andy Lau and Shu Qi

Other uses
 The Adventurers (Ral Partha), a set of fantasy miniatures designed by Tom Meier
 The Adventurers (novel), a 1966 novel by Harold Robbins, the basis of the 1970 film

See also
The Adventurer's, a Hong Kong television series
Adventurers (disambiguation)
Adventurer (disambiguation)
The Adventurer (disambiguation)